Gerp's mouse lemur (Microcebus gerpi) is a species of mouse lemur known only from the Sahafina Forest in eastern Madagascar, near Mantadia National Park.  Its discovery was announced in 2012 by a German and Malagasy research team.  The Sahafina Forest had not been studied until 2008 and 2009, when Groupe d'Étude et de Recherche sur les Primates de Madagascar (GERP)—a Malagasy-based research and conservation group for which the lemur is named—inventoried the forest's lemurs.

Jolly's mouse lemur, which is its closest relative and a neighbor to the south, is comparably larger, but differs in tail length and genetics.

Because it is a recently discovered species, little is known about its behavior, communication, ecology, or reproduction.  The species appears to be restricted to a small region of lowland evergreen rain forest, and is seriously threatened by forest loss.

Evolutionary and taxonomic history 

Gerp's mouse lemur was discovered by German and Malagasy members of the Malagasy organization Groupe d'Étude et de Recherche sur les Primates de Madagascar (GERP) in a previously unstudied lowland forest known as the Sahafina Forest in eastern Madagascar, near Mantadia National Park.  The first recorded specimen (holotype) of the species was captured on 25 June 2009, and was released after genetic samples, measurements, and photographs were taken.  At the time, it was not recognized as a distinct species of mouse lemur.  Two other paratypes were also measured and recorded, but no physical specimen was obtained by the publication of the initial study.

The discovery was published in the journal Primates in 2012. The species was named after the research and conservation team that described it. Gerp's mouse lemur differed genetically and physically from all of its nearest neighboring mouse lemur species. Its tail is longer than its closest relative, Jolly's mouse lemur (M. jollyae), which lives further south and whose tail is 18% shorter. Gerp's mouse lemur exhibits significant genetic differences from its northern neighbor, Simmons' mouse lemur (M. simmonsi).

The genetics tests initially conducted focused on three different loci of mitochondrial DNA: a partial D-loop region, MT-CYB, and COII.  D-loop analysis suggested Jolly's mouse lemur was Gerp's mouse lemur's closest relative (forming a sister group).  All three tests showed the mouse lemurs sampled from Sahafina formed a monophyletic clade (an exclusive family group) and the species was sufficiently distinct from other mouse lemurs.  The authors concluded both the molecular and morphological differences supported the declaration of a new species based on the phylogenetic species concept and a more conservative "integrative taxonomic approach".

Anatomy and physiology 
Among mouse lemurs, Gerp's mouse lemur is larger-bodied and has a long tail, which can be used to store fat.  The fur is darker on its back, which is brownish-gray with a broad reddish line down the middle, compared to the front, which varies from a light gray to creamy white and extends from the throat to the genitals.  The outer arms and legs contrast the rest of the body with their darker color, and the fingers have sparse, whitish-gray fur.  The head is reddish in color, with darker brown surrounding the eyes and a noticeable white stripe across the nose and between the eyes.  Its ears are prominent, yet small, with dark brown edges.  The tail is covered in dense, long, brownish-gray fur.  The undercoat is short and dense, while the guard hairs are sparser.  The skin visible on the hands and feet is colored pinkish-brown.

It is a large-bodied mouse lemur, and belongs to a group of large mouse lemurs (weighing more than ), including four eastern species—Simmons' mouse lemur, Jolly's mouse lemur, the northern rufous mouse lemur (M. tavaratra), and MacArthur's mouse lemur (M. macarthurii)—as well as six species of western mouse lemur: Claire's mouse lemur (M. mamiratra), Danfoss' mouse lemur (M. danfossi), the Bongolava mouse lemur (M. bongolavensis), the golden-brown mouse lemur (M. ravelobensis), the gray mouse lemur (M. murinus), and the reddish-gray mouse lemur (M. griseorufus). Most of these larger mouse lemur species have a long tail, as does Gerp's mouse lemur, with the exception of Jolly's mouse lemur and the gray mouse lemur. Its ears are small (measuring ), which conforms with that of other rainforest mouse lemur species, in contrast to larger-eared mouse lemurs of the dry, western forests (averaging ). As with all mouse lemurs, no body mass differences could be discerned between the sexes. However, larger samples are needed to confirm this.

Behavior 
No data are available concerning the behavior, communication, ecology, or reproduction of the Gerp's mouse lemur, although such data may help support its species status.

Distribution and habitat 

No major rivers separate these highland and lowland forests and their respective mouse lemur populations. The initial study did not conclude whether the large Rianila River or one of the smaller rivers—the Ivonoro and Onibe—further north acts as a species boundary between Gerp's mouse lemur and Simmons' mouse lemur (M. simmonsi) to the north. Approximately  the south lies the Mangoro River, a very large river that acts as a biogeographic barrier for many species. The geographic range of Gerp's mouse lemur is unlikely to extend south of this river, but more studies are needed to confirm this.

Conservation status 
There are no protected areas within the known geographic range of Gerp's mouse lemur. Because it lives in lowland forests, which are more likely to be converted into agricultural land relative to highland rainforests, it faces an elevated conservation risk.

References

Mouse lemurs
Endemic fauna of Madagascar
Mammals of Madagascar
Critically endangered fauna of Africa
Mammals described in 2012